The Ohrid spirlin (Alburnoides ohridanus) is a fish species of family Cyprinidae. This species is endemic to Lake Ohrid in North Macedonia and Albania in the Balkans. It is a benthopelagic temperate freshwater fish, up to 9 cm in length. It was originally named as a subspecies of Alburnoides bipunctatus. It is threatened by non-indigenous species of fish, many of which have been introduced into Lake Ohrid.

It grows to 9 cm in standard length and can be distinguished from other Balkan species of Alburnoides by having a distinctly upturned mouth, the eye diameter being equal to the length of the snout, a distinct indentation on the nape, a long caudal peduncle which is just under twice as long as it is deep, 42-44 scales on the lateral line and in having 11 branched rays in its anal fin. It occurs in the surf zone along the lake shore. It spawns in late spring, in May and June.

References 

Alburnoides
Fish described in 1928
Freshwater fish of Europe